Latvia has been occupied by military forces from other nations from time to time. Military occupations of Latvia have included:
 Livonian Crusade (13th century)
 Soviet occupation of Latvia in 1940
 Occupation of Latvia by Nazi Germany (1941–1945)
 Soviet re-occupation of Latvia in 1944
 Latvian Soviet Socialist Republic (21 July 1940 – 21 August 1991)

See also 
 Baltic states under Soviet rule (1944–1991)
 German occupation of the Baltic states during World War II
 Museum of the Occupation of Latvia
 Occupation of the Baltic states
 Soviet occupation of the Baltic states (1940)
 Soviet re-occupation of the Baltic states (1944)

Military occupations
Military occupations
Military history of Latvia